The 1986 Georgia gubernatorial election was held on November 4, 1986. Governor Joe Frank Harris (D) was overwhelmingly re-elected over Guy Davis (R) to win re-election. As the state was beginning to trend more Republican, this is the last election in which the Democrat won the governorship by double digits.

Every county in the state voted for Harris, who flipped every previously Republican county in this election. This was the last time the Democratic nominee for governor won Gwinnett and Cobb counties until Stacey Abrams won them in 2018.

General Election

References

1986
Georgia
Gubernatorial